Loveh District is a district (bakhsh) in Galikash County, Golestan Province, Iran. At the 2006 census, its population was 16,202, in 3,995 families.  The District has no cities.  The District has two rural districts (dehestan): Golestan Rural District and Qaravolan Rural District.

References 

Districts of Golestan Province
Galikash County